David Archer may refer to:

 David Archer (quarterback) (born 1962), American football player
 David Archer (American football coach) (born 1982), American football coach and former player
 David Archer (scientist) (born 1960), computational ocean chemist
 David Archer (field hockey) (born 1928), British Olympic hockey player
 David Archer (umpire) (1931–1992), West Indian cricketer and umpire
 Dave Archer (painter) (born 1941), reverse glass painter and sculptor
 David Archer (The Archers), a character in the BBC Radio soap opera The Archers